Radi is a village in Tuscany, central Italy, administratively a frazione of the comune of Monteroni d'Arbia, province of Siena. At the time of the 2001 census its population was 16.

References

Bibliography 
 

Frazioni of Monteroni d'Arbia